The Bowling Green is a park in the Hessian state capital of Wiesbaden.

The Bowling Green is of an elongated rectangle with two pools, one of each in the middle of three shells cascading fountain stands. On the east side the park joins the Kurhausplatz in front of the Kurhaus, Wiesbaden. Close behind the Kurhaus with its famous casino, stretches the Kurpark. On the west side of Bowling Green runs the Wilhelmstrasse. Across the street lies the Kaiser-Friedrich-Platz with the statue of Emperor Frederick III. The place is flanked by the luxury Hotel Nassauer Hof.

The Bowling Green is often used for open-air events for example held concerts by David Gilmour, Leonard Cohen, R.E.M., Sting, Nelly Furtado, Bryan Adams, Plácido Domingo, Lionel Richie, Eric Clapton, Elton John and Herbert Grönemeyer.

In addition, the Bowling Green is a place for special events. Every year in June, occur the Wilhelmstrassen festival, one of the largest street parties in Germany - and every New Year's Eve the largest party in Wiesbaden take place here.

References 
The information in this article is based on that in its German equivalent.

Urban public parks
Gardens in Hesse
Gardens in Germany
Tourist attractions in Wiesbaden
Culture in Wiesbaden